ADIF or Adif may refer to:

 Audio Data Interchange Format (ADIF), a file format to exchange Advanced Audio Coding (AAC) data; see 
 Administrador de Infraestructuras Ferroviarias, a Spanish state-owned railway infrastructure company
 Administración de Infraestructuras Ferroviarias Sociedad del Estado, an Argentine state-owned railway infrastructure company